Belinda Bencic and Yanina Wickmayer were the defending champions, but both chose not to participate.

Anna Blinkova and Alexandra Panova won the title, defeating Viktorija Golubic and Arantxa Rus in the final, 6–1, 6–1.

Seeds

Draw

Draw

References
Main Draw

Internationaux Féminins de la Vienne - Doubles